Yiddish (or , yidish or idish, ; , Yidish-Taytsh) is a West Germanic language historically spoken by Ashkenazi Jews. It originates from 9th century Central Europe, providing the nascent Ashkenazi community with a vernacular based on High German fused with many elements taken from Hebrew (notably Mishnaic) and to some extent Aramaic. Most varieties of Yiddish include elements of Slavic languages and the vocabulary contains traces of Romance languages. Yiddish is primarily written in the Hebrew alphabet.

Prior to World War II, its worldwide peak was 11 million, with the number of speakers in the United States and Canada then totaling 150,000. Eighty-five percent of the approximately six million Jews who were murdered in the Holocaust were Yiddish speakers, leading to a massive decline in the use of the language. Assimilation following World War II and aliyah (immigration to Israel) further decreased the use of Yiddish among survivors after adapting to Hebrew in Israel. However, the number of Yiddish-speakers is increasing in Hasidic communities. In the 1990s, there were around 1.5–2 million speakers of Yiddish, mostly Hasidic and Haredi Jews. A 2021 estimate from Rutgers University was that there were 250,000 American speakers, 250,000 Israeli speakers, and 100,000 in the rest of the world (for a total of 600,000).

Colloquially, the language is sometimes called  (mame-loshn, lit. The term "Yiddish", short for Yidish Taitsh ("Jewish German"), did not become the most frequently used designation in the literature until the 18th century. In the late 19th and into the 20th century, the language was more commonly called "Jewish", especially in non-Jewish contexts, but "Yiddish" is again the most common designation today.

Modern Yiddish has two major forms. Eastern Yiddish is far more common today. It includes Southeastern (Ukrainian–Romanian), Mideastern (Polish–Galician–Eastern Hungarian) and Northeastern (Lithuanian–Belarusian) dialects. Eastern Yiddish differs from Western both by its far greater size and by the extensive inclusion of words of Slavic origin. Western Yiddish is divided into Southwestern (Swiss–Alsatian–Southern German), Midwestern (Central German), and Northwestern (Netherlandic–Northern German) dialects. Yiddish is used in a number of Haredi Jewish communities worldwide; it is the first language of the home, school, and in many social settings among many Haredi Jews, and is used in most Hasidic yeshivas.

The term "Yiddish" is also used in the adjectival sense, synonymously with "Ashkenazi Jewish", to designate attributes of Yiddishkeit ("Ashkenazi culture"; for example, Yiddish cooking and "Yiddish music" – klezmer).

History

Origins 
By the 10th century, a distinctive Jewish culture had formed in Central Europe.
By the high medieval period, their area of settlement, centered on the Rhineland (Mainz) and the Palatinate (notably Worms and Speyer), came to be known as Ashkenaz, originally a term used of Scythia, and later of various areas of Eastern Europe and Anatolia.
In the medieval Hebrew of Rashi (d. 1105), Ashkenaz becomes a term for Germany, and  Ashkenazi for the Jews settling in this area.
Ashkenaz bordered on the area inhabited by another distinctive Jewish cultural group, the Sephardi Jews, who ranged into southern France. Ashkenazi culture later spread into Eastern Europe with large-scale population migrations.

Nothing is known with certainty about the vernacular of the earliest Jews in Germany, but several theories have been put forward. As noted above, the first language of the Ashkenazim may have been Aramaic, the vernacular of the Jews in Roman-era Judea and ancient and early medieval Mesopotamia.
The widespread use of Aramaic among the large non-Jewish Syrian trading population of the Roman provinces, including those in Europe, would have reinforced the use of Aramaic among Jews engaged in trade. In Roman times, many of the Jews living in Rome and Southern Italy appear to have been Greek-speakers, and this is reflected in some Ashkenazi personal names (e.g., Kalonymos and Yiddish Todres). Hebrew, on the other hand, was regarded as a holy language reserved for ritual and spiritual purposes and not for common use.

The established view is that, as with other Jewish languages, Jews speaking distinct languages learned new co-territorial vernaculars, which they then Judaized. In the case of Yiddish, this scenario sees it as emerging when speakers of Zarphatic (Judeo-French) and other Judeo-Romance languages began to acquire varieties of Middle High German, and from these groups the Ashkenazi community took shape. Exactly what German substrate underlies the earliest form of Yiddish is disputed.
The Jewish community in the Rhineland would have encountered the Middle High German dialects from which the Rhenish German dialects of the modern period would emerge.
Jewish communities of the high medieval period would have been speaking their own versions of these German dialects, mixed with linguistic elements that they themselves brought into the region, including many Hebrew and Aramaic words, but there is also Romance, Slavic, Turkic and Iranian influence.

In Max Weinreich's model, Jewish speakers of Old French or Old Italian who were literate in either liturgical Hebrew or Aramaic, or both, migrated through Southern Europe to settle in the Rhine Valley in an area known as Lotharingia (later known in Yiddish as Loter) extending over parts of Germany and France. There, they encountered and were influenced by Jewish speakers of High German languages and several other German dialects. Both Weinreich and Solomon Birnbaum developed this model further in the mid-1950s. In Weinreich's view, this Old Yiddish substrate later bifurcated into two distinct versions of the language, Western and Eastern Yiddish. They retained the Semitic vocabulary and constructions needed for religious purposes and created a Judeo-German form of speech, sometimes not accepted as a fully autonomous language.

Later linguistic research has refined the Weinreich model or provided alternative approaches to the language's origins, with points of contention being the characterization of its Germanic base, the source of its Hebrew/Aramaic adstrata, and the means and location of this fusion. Some theorists argue that the fusion occurred with a Bavarian dialect base.
The two main candidates for the germinal matrix of Yiddish, the Rhineland and Bavaria, are not necessarily incompatible. There may have been parallel developments in the two regions, seeding the Western and Eastern dialects of Modern Yiddish. Dovid Katz proposes that Yiddish emerged from contact between speakers of High German and Aramaic-speaking Jews from the Middle East. The lines of development proposed by the different theories do not necessarily rule out the others (at least not entirely); an article in The Forward argues that "in the end, a new 'standard theory' of Yiddish's origins will probably be based on the work of Weinreich and his challengers alike."

Paul Wexler proposed a model in 1991 that took Yiddish, by which he means primarily eastern Yiddish, not to be genetically grounded in a Germanic language at all, but rather as "Judeo-Sorbian" (a proposed West Slavic language) that had been relexified by High German. In more recent work, Wexler has argued that Eastern Yiddish is unrelated genetically to Western Yiddish. Wexler's model has been met with little academic support, and strong critical challenges, especially among historical linguists.
Das et al. (2016, co-authored by Wexler) use human genetics in support of the hypothesis of "a Slavic origin with strong Iranian and weak Turkic substrata".

Written evidence 

Yiddish orthography developed towards the end of the high medieval period. It is first recorded in 1272, with the oldest surviving literary document in Yiddish, a blessing found in the Worms machzor (a Hebrew prayer book).

This brief rhyme is decoratively embedded in an otherwise purely Hebrew text. The niqqud appears as though it might have been added by a second scribe, in which case it may need to be dated separately and may not be indicative of the pronunciation of the rhyme at the time of its initial annotation.

Over the course of the 14th and 15th centuries, songs and poems in Yiddish, and macaronic pieces in Hebrew and German, began to appear. These were collected in the late 15th century by Menahem ben Naphtali Oldendorf. During the same period, a tradition seems to have emerged of the Jewish community's adapting its own versions of German secular literature. The earliest Yiddish epic poem of this sort is the Dukus Horant, which survives in the famous Cambridge Codex T.-S.10.K.22. This 14th-century manuscript was discovered in the Cairo Geniza in 1896, and also contains a collection of narrative poems on themes from the Hebrew Bible and the Haggadah.

Printing 

The advent of the printing press in the 16th century enabled the large-scale production of works, at a cheaper cost, some of which have survived. One particularly popular work was Elia Levita's Bovo-Bukh, composed around 1507–08 and printed several times, beginning in 1541 (under the title Bovo d'Antona). Levita, the earliest named Yiddish author, may also have written  Pariz un Viene (Paris and Vienna). Another Yiddish retelling of a chivalric romance, װידװילט Vidvilt (often referred to as "Widuwilt" by Germanizing scholars), presumably also dates from the 15th century, although the manuscripts are from the 16th. It is also known as Kinig Artus Hof, an adaptation of the Middle High German romance Wigalois by Wirnt von Grafenberg. Another significant writer is Avroham ben Schemuel Pikartei, who published a paraphrase on the Book of Job in 1557.

Women in the Ashkenazi community were traditionally not literate in Hebrew but did read and write Yiddish. A body of literature therefore developed for which women were a primary audience. This included secular works, such as the Bovo-Bukh, and religious writing specifically for women, such as the  Tseno Ureno and the  Tkhines. One of the best-known early woman authors was Glückel of Hameln, whose memoirs are still in print.

The segmentation of the Yiddish readership, between women who read  mame-loshn but not  loshn-koydesh, and men who read both, was significant enough that distinctive typefaces were used for each. This distinction was retained in general typographic practice through to the early 19th century, with Yiddish books being set in vaybertaytsh (also termed  mesheyt or  mashket—the construction is uncertain).

An additional distinctive semicursive typeface was, and still is, used for rabbinical commentary on religious texts when Hebrew and Yiddish appear on the same page. This is commonly termed Rashi script, from the name of the most renowned early author, whose commentary is usually printed using this script. (Rashi is also the typeface normally used when the Sephardic counterpart to Yiddish, Judaeo-Spanish or Ladino, is printed in Hebrew script.)

Secularization 
The Western Yiddish dialect—sometimes pejoratively labeled Mauscheldeutsch, i. e. "Moses German"—declined in the 18th century, as the Age of Enlightenment and the Haskalah led to a view of Yiddish as a corrupt dialect. A Maskil (one who takes part in the Haskalah) would write about and promote acclimatization to the outside world. Jewish children began attending secular schools where the primary language spoken and taught was German, not Yiddish. Owing to both assimilation to German and the revival of Hebrew, Western Yiddish survived only as a language of "intimate family circles or of closely knit trade groups". (Liptzin 1972).

In eastern Europe, the response to these forces took the opposite direction, with Yiddish becoming the cohesive force in a secular culture (see the Yiddishist movement).

20th century 

In the early 20th century, especially after the Socialist October Revolution in Russia, Yiddish was emerging as a major Eastern European language. Its rich literature was more widely published than ever, Yiddish theatre and Yiddish cinema were booming, and for a time it achieved the status of one of the official languages of the short-lived Galician Soviet Socialist Republic. Educational autonomy for Jews in several countries (notably Poland) after World War I led to an increase in formal Yiddish-language education, more uniform orthography, and to the 1925 founding of the Yiddish Scientific Institute, YIVO. In Vilnius, there was debate over which language should take primacy, Hebrew or Yiddish.

Yiddish changed significantly during the 20th century. Michael Wex writes, "As increasing numbers of Yiddish speakers moved from the Slavic-speaking East to Western Europe and the Americas in the late 19th and early 20th centuries, they were so quick to jettison Slavic vocabulary that the most prominent Yiddish writers of the time—the founders of modern Yiddish literature, who were still living in Slavic-speaking countries—revised the printed editions of their oeuvres to eliminate obsolete and 'unnecessary' Slavisms." The vocabulary used in Israel absorbed many Modern Hebrew words, and there was a similar but smaller increase in the English component of Yiddish in the United States and, to a lesser extent, the United Kingdom. This has resulted in some difficulty in communication between Yiddish speakers from Israel and those from other countries.

Phonology 
There is significant phonological variation among the various Yiddish dialects. The description that follows is of a modern Standard Yiddish that was devised during the early 20th century and is frequently encountered in pedagogical contexts.

Consonants 

  are bilabial, whereas  are labiodental.
 The  contrast has collapsed in some speakers.
 The palatalized coronals  appear only in Slavic loanwords. The phonemic status of these palatalised consonants, as well as any other affricates, is unclear.
  is an allophone of  after , and it can only be syllabic .
  is an allophone of  before .
It is thus safe to assume that  is phonetically uvular .
This can mean that it is either palatalized alveolar  or alveolo-palatal .  may actually also be alveolo-palatal , rather than just palatal.
 The rhotic  can be either alveolar or uvular, either a trill  or, more commonly, a flap/tap .
 The glottal stop  appears only as an intervocalic separator.

As in the Slavic languages with which Yiddish was long in contact (Russian, Belarusian, Polish, and Ukrainian), but unlike German, voiceless stops have little to no aspiration; unlike many such languages, voiced stops are not devoiced in final position.

Vowels 
The vowel phonemes of Standard Yiddish are:

  are typically near-close  respectively, but the height of  may vary freely between a higher and lower allophone.
  appears only in unstressed syllables.

In addition, the sonorants  and  can function as syllable nuclei:

 אײזל   'donkey'
 אָװנט   'evening'

The syllabic sonorants are always unstressed.

Dialectal variation 
Stressed vowels in the Yiddish dialects may be understood by considering their common origins in the Proto-Yiddish sound system. Yiddish linguistic scholarship uses a system developed by Max Weinreich in 1960 to indicate the descendent diaphonemes of the Proto-Yiddish stressed vowels.

Each Proto-Yiddish vowel is given a unique two-digit identifier, and its reflexes use it as a subscript, for example Southeastern o11 is the vowel /o/, descended from Proto-Yiddish */a/. The first digit indicates Proto-Yiddish quality (1-=*[a], 2-=*[e], 3-=*[i], 4-=*[o], 5-=*[u]), and the second refers to quantity or diphthongization (−1=short, −2=long, −3=short but lengthened early in the history of Yiddish, −4=diphthong, −5=special length occurring only in Proto-Yiddish vowel 25).

Vowels 23, 33, 43 and 53 have the same reflexes as 22, 32, 42 and 52 in all Yiddish dialects, but they developed distinct values in Middle High German; Katz (1987) argues that they should be collapsed with the −2 series, leaving only 13 in the −3 series.

Comparison with German 

In vocabulary of Germanic origin, the differences between Standard German and Yiddish pronunciation are mainly in the vowels and diphthongs.

Diphthongs have also undergone divergent developments in German and Yiddish. Lastly, the Standard German  corresponds to both the MHG diphthong ou and the long vowel û, but in Yiddish, they have not merged.

The vowel length distinctions of German do not exist in the Northeastern (Lithuanian) varieties of Yiddish, which form the phonetic basis for Standard Yiddish. In those varieties, the vowel qualities in most long/short vowel pairs diverged and so the phonemic distinction has remained.

There are consonantal differences between German and Yiddish. Additionally, final voiced stops appear in Standard Yiddish but not Northern Standard German.

Comparison with Hebrew 
The pronunciation of vowels in Yiddish words of Hebrew origin is similar to Ashkenazi Hebrew but not identical. The most prominent difference is kamatz gadol in closed syllables being pronounced same as patah in Yiddish but the same as any other kamatz in Ashkenazi Hebrew. Also, Hebrew features no reduction of unstressed vowels and so the given name Jochebed  would be  in Ashkenazi Hebrew but  in Standard Yiddish.

Patah in open syllable, as well as hataf patah, are unpredictably split between A1 and A2:  ;  .

Grammar 
Yiddish grammar can vary slightly depending on the dialect. The main article focuses on standard form of Yiddish grammar while also acknowledging some dialectal differences. Yiddish grammar has similarities to the German grammar system, as well as grammatical elements from Hebrew and other Slavic languages.

Writing system 

Yiddish is written in the Hebrew alphabet, but its orthography differs significantly from that of Hebrew. Whereas, in Hebrew, many vowels are represented only optionally by diacritical marks called niqqud, Yiddish uses letters to represent all vowels. Several Yiddish letters consist of another letter combined with a niqqud mark resembling a Hebrew letter-niqqud pair, but each of those combinations is an inseparable unit representing a vowel alone, not a consonant-vowel sequence. The niqqud marks have no phonetic value on their own.

In most varieties of Yiddish, however, words borrowed from Hebrew are written in their native forms without application of Yiddish orthographical conventions.

Numbers of speakers 

On the eve of World War II, there were 11 to 13 million Yiddish speakers. The Holocaust, however, led to a dramatic, sudden decline in the use of Yiddish, as the extensive Jewish communities, both secular and religious, that used Yiddish in their day-to-day life were largely destroyed. Around five million of those killed85 percent of the Jews murdered in the Holocaustwere speakers of Yiddish. Although millions of Yiddish speakers survived the war (including nearly all Yiddish speakers in the Americas), further assimilation in countries such as the United States and the Soviet Union, in addition to the strictly monolingual stance of the Zionist movement, led to a decline in the use of Eastern Yiddish. However, the number of speakers within the widely dispersed Haredi (mainly Hasidic) communities is now increasing. Although used in various countries, Yiddish has attained official recognition as a minority language only in Moldova, Bosnia and Herzegovina, the Netherlands, and Sweden.

Reports of the number of current Yiddish speakers vary significantly. Ethnologue estimates, based on publications through 1991, that there were at that time 1.5 million speakers of Eastern Yiddish, of which 40% lived in Ukraine, 15% in Israel, and 10% in the United States. The Modern Language Association agrees with fewer than 200,000 in the United States. Western Yiddish is reported by Ethnologue to have had an ethnic population of 50,000 in 2000, and an undated speaking population of 5,000, mostly in Germany. A 1996 report by the Council of Europe estimates a worldwide Yiddish-speaking population of about two million. Further demographic information about the recent status of what is treated as an Eastern–Western dialect continuum is provided in the YIVO Language and Cultural Atlas of Ashkenazic Jewry.

In the Hasidic communities of Israel, boys speak more Yiddish amongst themselves, while girls use Hebrew more often. This is probably due to the fact that girls tend to learn more secular subjects, thus increasing contact with the Hebrew language, and boys are usually taught religious subjects in Yiddish.

Status as a language 

There has been frequent debate about the extent of the linguistic independence of Yiddish from the languages that it absorbed. There has been periodic assertion that Yiddish is a dialect of German, or even "just broken German, more of a linguistic mishmash than a true language". Even when recognized as an autonomous language, it has sometimes been referred to as Judeo-German, along the lines of other Jewish languages like Judeo-Persian, Judeo-Spanish or Judeo-French. A widely cited summary of attitudes in the 1930s was published by Max Weinreich, quoting a remark by an auditor of one of his lectures:  ( — "A language is a dialect with an army and navy").

Israel and Zionism 

The national language of Israel is modern Hebrew. The debate in Zionist circles over the use of Yiddish in Israel and in the diaspora in preference to Hebrew also reflected the tensions between religious and secular Jewish lifestyles. Many secular Zionists wanted Hebrew as the sole language of Jews, to contribute to a national cohesive identity. Traditionally religious Jews, on the other hand, preferred use of Yiddish, viewing Hebrew as a respected holy language reserved for prayer and religious study. In the early 20th century, Zionist activists in the Mandate of Palestine tried to eradicate the use of Yiddish among Jews in preference to Hebrew, and make its use socially unacceptable.

This conflict also reflected the opposing views among secular Jews worldwide, one side seeing Hebrew (and Zionism) and the other Yiddish (and Internationalism) as the means of defining Jewish nationalism. In the 1920s and 1930s, "Battalion for the Defence of the Language", whose motto was " ", that is, "Hebrew [i.e. Jew], speak Hebrew!", used to tear down signs written in "foreign" languages and disturb Yiddish theatre gatherings. However, according to linguist Ghil'ad Zuckermann, the members of this group in particular, and the Hebrew revival in general, did not succeed in uprooting Yiddish patterns (as well as the patterns of other European languages Jewish immigrants spoke) within what he calls "Israeli", i.e. Modern Hebrew. Zuckermann believes that "Israeli does include numerous Hebrew elements resulting from a conscious revival but also numerous pervasive linguistic features deriving from a subconscious survival of the revivalists’ mother tongues, e.g. Yiddish."

After the founding of the State of Israel, a massive wave of Jewish immigrants from Arab countries arrived. In short order, these Mizrahi Jews and their descendants would account for nearly half the Jewish population. While all were at least familiar with Hebrew as a liturgical language, essentially none had any contact with or affinity for Yiddish (some, of Sephardic origin, spoke Judeo-Spanish, others various Judeo-Arabic varieties). Thus, Hebrew emerged as the dominant linguistic common denominator between the different population groups.

Despite a past of marginalization and anti-Yiddish government policy, in 1996 the Knesset passed a law founding the "National Authority for Yiddish Culture", with the aim of supporting and promoting contemporary Yiddish art and literature, as well as preservation of Yiddish culture and publication of Yiddish classics, both in Yiddish and in Hebrew translation.

In religious circles, it is the Ashkenazi Haredi Jews, particularly the Hasidic Jews and the Lithuanian yeshiva world (see Lithuanian Jews), who continue to teach, speak and use Yiddish, making it a language used regularly by hundreds of thousands of Haredi Jews today. The largest of these centers are in Bnei Brak and Jerusalem.

There is a growing revival of interest in Yiddish culture among secular Israelis, with the flourishing of new proactive cultural organizations like YUNG YiDiSH, as well as Yiddish theatre (usually with simultaneous translation to Hebrew and Russian) and young people are taking university courses in Yiddish, some achieving considerable fluency.

South Africa 

In the early years of the 20th century Yiddish was classified as a 'Semitic Language'. After much campaigning, in 1906 the South African legislator Morris Alexander won a parliamentary fight to have Yiddish reclassified as a European language, thereby permitting the immigration of Yiddish-speakers to South Africa.

Former Soviet Union 

In the Soviet Union during the era of the New Economic Policy (NEP) in the 1920s, Yiddish was promoted as the language of the Jewish proletariat. At the same time, Hebrew was considered a bourgeois and reactionary language and its use was generally discouraged. Yiddish was one of the "recognized" languages of the Byelorussian Soviet Socialist Republic. Until 1938, the Emblem of the Byelorussian Soviet Socialist Republic included the motto Workers of the world, unite! in Yiddish. Yiddish was also an official language in several agricultural districts of the Galician Soviet Socialist Republic.

The use of Yiddish as the primary spoken language by Jews was heavily encouraged by multiple Jewish political groups at the time. The Evsketsii, the Jewish Communist Group, and The Bund, the Jewish Socialist Group, both heavily encouraged the use of Yiddish. During the Bolshevik Era these political groups worked alongside the government to encourage the widespread Jewish use of Yiddish. Both the Evsketsii and the Bund supported the Jewish movement towards assimilation and saw Yiddish as a way to encourage it. They saw the use of Yiddish as a step away from the religious aspects of Judaism, instead favoring the cultural aspects of Judaism. 

A public educational system entirely based on the Yiddish language was established and comprised kindergartens, schools, and higher educational institutions (technical schools, rabfaks and other university departments).  These were initially created to stop Jewish children from taking too many spots in regular Soviet schools. The Soviets feared that the Jewish children were both taking spots from non-Jews as well as spreading revolutionary ideas to their non-Jewish peers. As a result, in 1914 laws were passed that guaranteed Jews the right to a Jewish education and as a result the Yiddish education system was established. After the Bolshevik revolution in 1917 even more Yiddish schools were established. These schools thrived with government, specifically Bolshevik, and Jewish support. They were established as part of the effort to revitalize the Soviet Jewish Community. Specifically, the Bolsheviks wanted to encourage Jewish assimilation. While these schools were taught in Yiddish, the content was Soviet. They were created to attract Jews in to getting a Soviet education under the guise of a Jewish institution.  

While schools with curriculums taught in Yiddish existed in some areas until the 1950s, there was a general decline in enrollment due to preference for Russian-speaking institutions and the declining reputation of Yiddish schools among Yiddish speaking Soviets. As the Yiddish schools declined, so did overall Yiddish culture. The two were inherently linked and with the downfall of one, so did the other.  General Soviet denationalization programs and secularization policies also led to a further lack of enrollment and funding; the last schools to be closed existed until 1951. It continued to be spoken widely for decades, nonetheless, in areas with compact Jewish populations (primarily in Moldova, Ukraine, and to a lesser extent Belarus). 

In the former Soviet states, recently active Yiddish authors include Yoysef Burg (Chernivtsi 1912–2009) and Olexander Beyderman (b. 1949, Odessa). Publication of an earlier Yiddish periodical ( – ; lit. The New Friend, Saint Petersburg).

Russia 

According to the 2010 census, 1,683 people spoke Yiddish in Russia, approximately 1% of all the Jews of the Russian Federation. According to Mikhail Shvydkoy, former Minister of Culture of Russia and himself of Jewish origin, Yiddish culture in Russia is gone, and its revival is unlikely.

Jewish Autonomous Oblast 

The Jewish Autonomous Oblast was formed in 1934 in the Russian Far East, with its capital city in Birobidzhan and Yiddish as its official language. The intention was for the Soviet Jewish population to settle there. Jewish cultural life was revived in Birobidzhan much earlier than elsewhere in the Soviet Union. Yiddish theaters began opening in the 1970s. The newspaper  (lit: The Birobidzhan Star) includes a Yiddish section. In modern Russia, the cultural significance of the language is still recognized and bolstered. The First Birobidzhan International Summer Program for Yiddish Language and Culture was launched in 2007.

, according to data provided by the Russian Census Bureau, there were 97 speakers of Yiddish in the JAO. A November 2017 article in The Guardian, titled, "Revival of a Soviet Zion: Birobidzhan celebrates its Jewish heritage", examined the current status of the city and suggested that, even though the Jewish Autonomous Region in Russia's far east is now barely 1% Jewish, officials hope to woo back people who left after Soviet collapse and to revive the Yiddish language in this region.

Ukraine 

Yiddish was an official language of the Ukrainian People's Republic (1917–1921).

Council of Europe 

Several countries that ratified the 1992 European Charter for Regional or Minority Languages have included Yiddish in the list of their recognized minority languages: the Netherlands (1996), Sweden (2000), Romania (2008), Poland (2009), Bosnia and Herzegovina (2010). In 2005, Ukraine did not mention Yiddish as such, but "the language(s) of the Jewish ethnic minority".

Sweden 

In June 1999, the Swedish Parliament enacted legislation giving Yiddish legal status as one of the country's official minority languages (entering into effect in April 2000). The rights thereby conferred are not detailed, but additional legislation was enacted in June 2006 establishing a new governmental agency, The Swedish National Language Council, the mandate of which instructs it to "collect, preserve, scientifically research, and spread material about the national minority languages", naming them all explicitly, including Yiddish. When announcing this action, the government made an additional statement about "simultaneously commencing completely new initiatives for... Yiddish [and the other minority languages]".

The Swedish government has published documents in Yiddish detailing the national action plan for human rights. An earlier one provides general information about national minority language policies.

On September 6, 2007, it became possible to register Internet domains with Yiddish names in the national top-level domain .se.

The first Jews were permitted to reside in Sweden during the late 18th century. The Jewish population in Sweden is estimated at 20,000. Of these, according to various reports and surveys, between 2,000 and 6,000 claim to have at least some knowledge of Yiddish. In 2009, the number of native speakers among these was estimated by linguist Mikael Parkvall to be 750–1,500. It is believed that virtually all native speakers of Yiddish in Sweden today are adults, and most of them elderly.

United States 

In the United States, at first most Jews were of Sephardic origin, and hence did not speak Yiddish. It was not until the mid-to-late 19th century, as first German Jews, then Central and Eastern European Jews, arrived in the nation, that Yiddish became dominant within the immigrant community. This helped to bond Jews from many countries.  ( – The Forward) was one of seven Yiddish daily newspapers in New York City, and other Yiddish newspapers served as a forum for Jews of all European backgrounds. In 1915, the circulation of the daily Yiddish newspapers was half a million in New York City alone, and 600,000 nationally. In addition, thousands more subscribed to the numerous weekly papers and the many magazines.

The typical circulation in the 21st century is a few thousand. The Forward still appears weekly and is also available in an online edition. (The romanized titles cited in this paragraph are in the form given on the masthead of each publication and may be at some variance both with the literal Yiddish title and the transliteration rules otherwise applied in this article.) Thriving Yiddish theater, especially in the New York City Yiddish Theatre District, kept the language vital. Interest in klezmer music provided another bonding mechanism.

Most of the Jewish immigrants to the New York metropolitan area during the years of Ellis Island considered Yiddish their native language; however, native Yiddish speakers tended not to pass the language on to their children, who assimilated and spoke English. For example, Isaac Asimov states in his autobiography In Memory Yet Green that Yiddish was his first and sole spoken language, and remained so for about two years after he emigrated to the United States as a small child. By contrast, Asimov's younger siblings, born in the United States, never developed any degree of fluency in Yiddish.

Many "Yiddishisms", like "Italianisms" and "Spanishisms", entered New York City English, often used by Jews and non-Jews alike, unaware of the linguistic origin of the phrases. Yiddish words used in English were documented extensively by Leo Rosten in The Joys of Yiddish; see also the list of English words of Yiddish origin.

In 1975, the film Hester Street, much of which is in Yiddish, was released. It was later chosen to be on the Library of Congress National Film Registry for being considered a "culturally, historically, or aesthetically significant" film.

In 1976, the Canadian-born American author Saul Bellow received the Nobel Prize in Literature. He was fluent in Yiddish, and translated several Yiddish poems and stories into English, including Isaac Bashevis Singer's "Gimpel the Fool". In 1978, Singer, a writer in the Yiddish language, who was born in Poland and lived in the United States, received the Nobel Prize in Literature.

Legal scholars Eugene Volokh and Alex Kozinski argue that Yiddish is "supplanting Latin as the spice in American legal argot".

Present U.S. speaker population 

In the 2000 United States Census, 178,945 people in the United States reported speaking Yiddish at home. Of these speakers, 113,515 lived in New York (63.43% of American Yiddish speakers); 18,220 in Florida (10.18%); 9,145 in New Jersey (5.11%); and 8,950 in California (5.00%). The remaining states with speaker populations larger than 1,000 are Pennsylvania (5,445), Ohio (1,925), Michigan (1,945), Massachusetts (2,380), Maryland (2,125), Illinois (3,510), Connecticut (1,710), and Arizona (1,055). The population is largely elderly: 72,885 of the speakers were older than 65, 66,815 were between 18 and 64, and only 39,245 were age 17 or lower.

In the six years since the 2000 census, the 2006 American Community Survey reflected an estimated 15 percent decline of people speaking Yiddish at home in the U.S. to 152,515. In 2011, the number of persons in the United States above the age of five speaking Yiddish at home was 160,968. 88% of them were living in four metropolitan areas – New York City and another metropolitan area just north of it, Miami, and Los Angeles.

There are a few predominantly Hasidic communities in the United States in which Yiddish remains the majority language including concentrations in the Crown Heights, Borough Park, and Williamsburg neighborhoods of Brooklyn. In Kiryas Joel in Orange County, New York, in the 2000 census, nearly 90% of residents of Kiryas Joel reported speaking Yiddish at home.

United Kingdom 

There are well over 30,000 Yiddish speakers in the United Kingdom, and several thousand children now have Yiddish as a first language. The largest group of Yiddish speakers in Britain reside in the Stamford Hill district of North London, but there are sizable communities in northwest London, Leeds, Manchester and Gateshead. The Yiddish readership in the UK is mainly reliant upon imported material from the United States and Israel for newspapers, magazines and other periodicals. However, the London-based weekly Jewish Tribune has a small section in Yiddish called  . From the 1910s to the 1950s, London had a daily Yiddish newspaper called  (in English, The Time), founded, and edited from offices in Whitechapel Road, by Romanian-born Morris Myer, who was succeeded on his death in 1943 by his son Harry. There were also from time to time Yiddish newspapers in Manchester, Liverpool, Glasgow and Leeds. Bilingual Yiddish and English café the Pink Peacock opened in Glasgow in 2021.

Canada 

Montreal had, and to some extent still has, one of the most thriving Yiddish communities in North America. Yiddish was Montreal's third language (after French and English) for the entire first half of the twentieth century.  (The Canadian Eagle, founded by Hirsch Wolofsky), Montreal's daily Yiddish newspaper, appeared from 1907 to 1988. The Monument-National was the center of Yiddish theater from 1896 until the construction of the Saidye Bronfman Centre for the Arts (now the Segal Centre for Performing Arts), inaugurated on September 24, 1967, where the established resident theater, the Dora Wasserman Yiddish Theatre, remains the only permanent Yiddish theatre in North America. The theatre group also tours Canada, US, Israel, and Europe.

Even though Yiddish has receded, it is the immediate ancestral language of Montrealers like Mordecai Richler and Leonard Cohen, as well as former interim city mayor Michael Applebaum. Besides Yiddish-speaking activists, it remains today the native everyday language of 15,000 Montreal Hasidim.

Religious communities 

Major exceptions to the decline of spoken Yiddish are found in Haredi communities all over the world. In some of the more closely knit such communities, Yiddish is spoken as a home and schooling language, especially in Hasidic, Litvish, or Yeshivish communities, such as Brooklyn's Borough Park, Williamsburg, and Crown Heights, and in the communities of Monsey, Kiryas Joel, and New Square in New York (over 88% of the population of Kiryas Joel is reported to speak Yiddish at home.) Also in New Jersey, Yiddish is widely spoken mostly in Lakewood Township, but also in smaller towns with yeshivas, such as Passaic, Teaneck, and elsewhere. Yiddish is also widely spoken in the Jewish community in Antwerp, and in Haredi communities such as the ones in London, Manchester, and Montreal. Yiddish is also spoken in many Haredi communities throughout Israel. Among most Ashkenazi Haredim, Hebrew is generally reserved for prayer, while Yiddish is used for religious studies, as well as a home and business language. In Israel, however, Haredim commonly speak modern Hebrew, with the notable exception of many Hasidic communities. However, many Haredim who use Modern Hebrew also understand Yiddish. There are some who send their children to schools in which the primary language of instruction is Yiddish. Members of anti-Zionist Haredi groups such as the Satmar Hasidim, who view the commonplace use of Hebrew as a form of Zionism, use Yiddish almost exclusively.

Hundreds of thousands of young children around the globe have been, and are still, taught to translate the texts of the Torah into Yiddish. This process is called  – 'translating'. Many Ashkenazi yeshivas' highest level lectures in Talmud and Halakha are delivered in Yiddish by the rosh yeshivas as well as ethical talks of the Musar movement. Hasidic rebbes generally use only Yiddish to converse with their followers and to deliver their various Torah talks, classes, and lectures. The linguistic style and vocabulary of Yiddish have influenced the manner in which many Orthodox Jews who attend yeshivas speak English. This usage is distinctive enough that it has been dubbed "Yeshivish".

While Hebrew remains the exclusive language of Jewish prayer, the Hasidim have mixed some Yiddish into their Hebrew, and are also responsible for a significant secondary religious literature written in Yiddish. For example, the tales about the Baal Shem Tov were written largely in Yiddish. The Torah Talks of the late Chabad leaders are published in their original form, Yiddish. In addition, some prayers, such as "God of Abraham", were composed and are recited in Yiddish.

Modern Yiddish education 

There has been a resurgence in Yiddish learning in recent times among many from around the world with Jewish ancestry. The language which had lost many of its native speakers during the Holocaust has been making something of a comeback. In Poland, which traditionally had Yiddish speaking communities, a museum has begun to revive Yiddish education and culture. Located in Kraków, the Galicia Jewish Museum offers classes in Yiddish Language Instruction and workshops on Yiddish Songs. The museum has taken steps to revive the culture through concerts and events held on site.
There are various universities worldwide which now offer Yiddish programs based on the YIVO Yiddish standard. Many of these programs are held during the summer and are attended by Yiddish enthusiasts from around the world. One such school located within Vilnius University (Vilnius Yiddish Institute) was the first Yiddish center of higher learning to be established in post-Holocaust Eastern Europe. Vilnius Yiddish Institute is an integral part of the four-century-old Vilnius University. Published Yiddish scholar and researcher Dovid Katz is among the Faculty.

Despite this growing popularity among many American Jews, finding opportunities for practical use of Yiddish is becoming increasingly difficult, and thus many students have trouble learning to speak the language. One solution has been the establishment of a farm in Goshen, New York, for Yiddishists.

Yiddish is the medium of instruction in many Hasidic  , Jewish boys' schools, and some Hasidic girls' schools.

Sholem Aleichem College, a secular Jewish primary school in Melbourne teaches Yiddish as a second language to all its students. The school was founded in 1975 by the Bund movement in Australia, and still maintains daily Yiddish instruction today, and includes student theater and music in Yiddish.

Internet 

Google Translate includes Yiddish as one of its languages, as does Wikipedia. Hebrew alphabet keyboards are available and right-to-left writing recognised. Google Search accepts queries in Yiddish.

Over ten thousand Yiddish texts, estimated as over half of all the published works in Yiddish, are now online based on the work of the Yiddish Book Center, volunteers, and the Internet Archive.

There are many websites on the Internet in Yiddish. In January 2013, The Forward announced the launch of the new daily version of their newspaper's website, which has been active since 1999 as an online weekly, supplied with radio and video programs, a literary section for fiction writers and a special blog written in local contemporary Hasidic dialects.

Computer scientist Raphael Finkel maintains a hub of Yiddish-language resources, including a searchable dictionary and spell checker.

In late 2016, Motorola, Inc. released its smartphones with keyboard access for the Yiddish language in its foreign language option.

On 5 April 2021, Duolingo added Yiddish to its courses.

Influence on other languages 

In addition to Modern Hebrew and New York English, especially as spoken by yeshivah students (sometimes known as Yeshivish), Yiddish has influenced Cockney in England and to some degree the city dialects of Vienna and Berlin. French argot has some words coming from Yiddish.

Paul Wexler proposed that Esperanto was not an arbitrary pastiche of major European languages but a Latinate relexification of Yiddish, a native language of its founder. This model is generally unsupported by mainstream linguists.

Language examples 

Here is a short example of the Yiddish language with standard German as a comparison.

See also 

 List of Yiddish-language poets
 List of Yiddish newspapers and periodicals
 The Yiddish King Lear
 Yinglish
 Yiddish symbols
 Judaeo-Spanish (Ladino), language historically spoken by Sephardi Jews
 Judeo-Iranian languages, languages historically spoken by Mizrahi Jews in the former territories of the Persian Empire

References

Bibliography 

 
 
 
 
 
 
 
 
 
 
 
 
 
 
 
 
 
 
 
 Shternshis, Anna (2006). Soviet and Kosher: Jewish Popular Culture in the Soviet Union, 1923–1939. Bloomington, IN: Indiana University Press.

Further reading 

 YIVO Bleter, pub. YIVO Institute for Jewish Research, NYC, initial series from 1931, new series since 1991.
 Afn Shvel, pub. League for Yiddish, NYC, since 1940; אויפן שוועל, sample article אונדזער פרץ – Our Peretz
 Lebns-fragn, by-monthly for social issues, current affairs, and culture, Tel Aviv, since 1951; לעבנס-פראגן, current issue
 Yerusholaymer Almanakh, periodical collection of Yiddish literature and culture, Jerusalem, since 1973; ירושלימער אלמאנאך, new volume, contents and downloads
 Der Yiddisher Tam-Tam, pub. Maison de la Culture Yiddish, Paris, since 1994, also available in electronic format.
 Yidishe Heftn, pub. Le Cercle Bernard Lazare, Paris, since 1996, יידישע העפטן sample cover, subscription info.
 Gilgulim, naye shafungen, new literary magazine, Paris, since 2008; גילגולים, נייע שאפונגען

External links 

 Yiddish Book Center
 YIVO Institute for Jewish Research: Yiddish Dictionaries
 The Israeli National Authority of Yiddish Culture
 Comparison of Eastern and Western Yiddish based on stable vocabulary. EVOLAEMP Project, University of Tübingen.
 In Geveb: A Journal of Yiddish Studies

 
Ashkenazi Jews topics
Jewish languages
Jews and Judaism in Germany
German dialects
High German languages
Languages of Israel
Languages of Poland
Languages of Russia
Languages of Ukraine
Languages of Georgia (country)
Diaspora languages
Subject–verb–object languages
Verb-second languages
Endangered diaspora languages
Languages of Germany